Bensoussan is a Maghrebi Jewish surname, variant form of Ben Soussan, Bensussan, Bensusan and Ibn Shushan. It is derived from the Hebrew shôshannah "lily". Notable people with the surname include:

 Babette Bensoussan, an Australian author and competitive intelligence specialist
 David Bensoussan, engineering professor, Montreal Jewish communal leader, historian of the Jews of Morocco 
 David Bensusan-Butt (1914-1994), an English economist
 Eddy Bensoussan, a Brazilian physician
 Michel Bensoussan (born 1954), a French former professional football player
 Moses Bensusan (born 1968), a Canadian-American real estate developer
 Pierre Bensusan (born 1957), a French-Algerian guitarist
 Pierre-Luc Ben Soussan founder of musical group Naguila
 Rene Ben Sussan (born 1895), a French illustrator
 Dr Ruth Bensusan-Butt (1877-1957)
 Samuel L. Bensusan (1872 – 1958), English author

Other uses
 Bensoussan or Bensousan Han, were built since 1810

Maghrebi Jewish surnames
Arabic-language surnames
Surnames of Moroccan origin
Surnames of Algerian origin
Sephardic surnames